Grégory Ditanth  Gomis (born 4 November 1990) is a French born-Bissau-Guinean footballer playing as a goalkeeper.

Club career
After playing for Vannes in the third division of French football, he signed for Qatari club Al-Salliya in 2012. In 2014, he won the Emir of Qatar Cup with the club. He soon extended his contract with the outfit. Gomis won 2014 Best goalkeeper of Qatar Stars league.

International career
Gomis was pre-called up by Guinea-Bissau for the 2019 Africa Cup of Nations.

References

External links
 http://www.thepeninsulaqatar.com/sports/football/360958/qsl-heroic-gomis-gives-al-sailiya-full-points
 http://www.qna.org.qa/en-us/News/15120419130028/Qatar-Stars-League-Al-Sailiya-Beat-Al-Sadd-2-1*

1990 births
Living people
French footballers
French expatriate footballers
Citizens of Guinea-Bissau through descent
Bissau-Guinean footballers
Guinea-Bissau international footballers
Bissau-Guinean expatriate footballers
French people of Bissau-Guinean descent
Sportspeople from Bissau
Sportspeople from Versailles, Yvelines
Association football goalkeepers
Championnat National players
Vannes OC players
Qatar Stars League players
Al-Sailiya SC players
Al-Arabi SC (Qatar) players
French expatriate sportspeople in Qatar
Expatriate footballers in Qatar
Footballers from Yvelines